The Journal of the Bombay Natural History Society (also JBNHS) is a natural history journal published several times a year by the Bombay Natural History Society. First published in January 1886, and published with only a few interruptions since, the JBNHS is one of the best-known journals in the fields of natural history, conservation, and biodiversity research.

Major editors: 1886–1985
Format: decade. major editor(s). (For more details, see .)
1886–1895: R. A. Sterndale, E. H. Aitken, & H. M. Phipson
1896–1905: H. M. Phipson & W. S. Millard
1906–1915: W. S. Millard, R. A. Spence & N. B. Kinnear
1916–1925: W. S. Millard, R. A. Spence, N. B. Kinnear, & S. H. Prater
1926–1935: R. A. Spence, S. H. Prater, P. M. D. Sanderson, & Sálim Ali.
1936–1945: M. J. Dickins, P. M. D. Sanderson, S. H. Prater, C. McCann, H. M. McGusty & J. F. Caius.
1946–1955: S. H. Prater, C. McCann, Sálim Ali, S. B. Setna, & H. Santapau.
1956–1965: Sálim Ali, H. Santapau, H. Abdulali, & Z. Futehally.
1966–1975: H. Santapau, D. E. Reuben, Z. Futehally, J. C. Daniel, & P. V. Bole.
1976–1985. J. C. Daniel, P. V. Bole & A. N. D. Nanavati.

Illustrations

Notes

References

External links
 
 Scanned Journal volumes 1–106 at the Biodiversity Heritage Library

Biology journals
Science and technology magazines published in India
Mass media in Mumbai
Natural history of India
Publications established in 1886
1886 establishments in British India
1886 establishments in India